This is a list of monarchs who lost their thrones in the 16th century.  This list currently holds 27 countries.

Austria

Charles V, Holy Roman Emperor, title of Archduke of Austria passed over to Ferdinand I, Holy Roman Emperor in 1521.

Aztec Empire
Cuauhtémoc, the last Independent Emperor of the Aztecs, deposed by Spain 1521 died 1525.
Luis Nanacacipactzin  was the last dynastic-lined ruler (under Spanish occupation) up to his death in 1565.

Badakhshan
Humayun (Sultan of India 1530-1539 and 1555-1556), ruler of Badakhshan 1520-1529, deposed or abdicated 1529, died 1556.

Egypt

Al-Mutawakkil III, The Caliph, deposed 1516, restored 1517.

Cambodia

Brhat Pada Samdach Sdach Brhat Rajankariya Brhat Mahindra Rajadhiraja Ramadipati Sri Suriya Varman Maha Chakrapati Varman Naranga Ridhi Sanditya Isvara Kambul Krung Kambuja Adipati Sri Sudhara Pawara Indrapada Gururatta Rajadhaniya Tissarana Naya Mahayana Jathi Brhat Paramanatha Parama Bupati Jaya Amachas Mahindaraja of Cambodia, King of Cambodia, deposed 1594.

Castile

Ferdinand II of Aragon, King of Castile with Isabela I. Castile passed over to Philip of Burgundy in 1504.

Carinthia

Charles V, Holy Roman Emperor, Duke of Carinthia 1519-1521, title passed over to Ferdinand I, Holy Roman Emperor.

Carniola
Charles V, Holy Roman Emperor, Duke of Carniola. Title passed to Ferdinand I, Holy Roman Emperor, in 1521.

Ecatepec

Diego Huanitzin, Tlatoani of Ecatepec. Following Spanish colonisation in 1539, Huanitzin became the first Governor of the region.

Guelders

Wilhelm, Duke of Jülich-Cleves-Berg, Duke of Guelders 1539-1543, Guelders then passed to Charles V, Holy Roman Emperor .

Holy Roman Empire

Charles V, Holy Roman Emperor, abdicated 1556.

Kashmir

Muhammad Shah, King of Kashmir 1484, 1493-1505, 1514-1515, 1516-1528 and 1530-1537. Died 1537.
Fath Shah, King of Kashmir 1486-1493, 1505-1514 and 1515-1516.  Died 1516.
Nazuk Shah, King of Kashmir 1529-1530 and 1540-1552.  Deposed or abdicated 1530, restored 1540 and died 1552.
Yusuf Shah, King of Kashmir 1579 and 1580-1586. Deposed 1579, but restored 1580.  Died 1586.
Yaqub Shah, King of Kashmir 1586.  Deposed 1586, died 1588.

Kelantan
Raja Umar bin Raja Ahmad, Raja of Kelantan, abdicated 1570.

León

Ferdinand II of Aragon, King of León with Isabella I. León was passed to Philip of Burgundy in 1504.

Lugano
Lodovico Sforza 1484-1501, died 1508

Malacca

Paduka Sri Sultan Mahmud Shah I ibni al-Marhum Sultan 'Ala ud-din Ri'ayat Shah Shah Sultan of Malacca and Johor 1488 - 1528, deposed 1528,died 1530.

Mecca

Barakat II bin Muhammad Amir and Sharif of Mecca 1497 - 1525, expelled by his brother.

Naples
Frederick IV, King of Naples, deposed 1501.

Persia
Mohammed Khodabanda Shah of Persia. Deposed 1587.

Portugal
António I of Portugal, deposed after a short war with Philip II of Spain, from then on also Philip I of Portugal.

Saluzzo

Giovanni Ludovico of Saluzzo, Marquess of Saluzzo, deposed 1529.

Scotland

Mary, Queen of Scots, deposed 1567.

Styria

Charles V, Holy Roman Emperor, 1521. The title Duke of Styria passed to Ferdinand I, Holy Roman Emperor.

Sweden
Eric XIV, King, deposed 1568
Sigmund, King of Poland and Sweden, deposed in Sweden 1599

Timurid dynasty

Badi' al-Zaman ruler of the Timurid dynasty (in Herat). Deposed 1507.

Tlacopan

Tetlepanquetzal, King of Tlacopan. Deposed by the Spanish in 1521. Died 1525.

Tulsipur
 Chauhan Raja Dev Narayan Singh ceased to be king of the House of Tulsipur, 1575.

Tyrol

Charles V, Holy Roman Emperor 1519-1521,Count of Tyrol, title passed over to Ferdinand I, Holy Roman Emperor .

Zapotec

Cocijopi Xolo King of the Zapotec 1529-1530s, died 1563.

Zutphen

Wilhelm, Duke of Jülich-Cleves-Berg, ceased to be Duke of Zutphen in 1543 when authority over Zutphen was passed to Charles V, Holy Roman Emperor.

See also
List of monarchs who abdicated
List of monarchs who lost their thrones in the 19th century
List of monarchs who lost their thrones in the 18th century
List of monarchs who lost their thrones in the 17th century
List of monarchs who lost their thrones in the 15th century
List of monarchs who lost their thrones in the 14th century
List of monarchs who lost their thrones in the 13th century
List of monarchs who lost their thrones before the 13th century

16
 
16th-century monarchs
Lists of 16th-century people